Otto Johan Tandefelt (born 13 April 1782) was a Finnish murderer. He was a Swedish-speaking Finn and was born in Sysmä, Voipala, Finland.

He was a key figure in the lynching of Axel von Fersen on 20 June 1810 in Stockholm and was one of the very few to be charged and convicted for the killing. After serving some years at Älvsborg fortress, he was pardoned by King Charles XIII, and eventually emigrated to the Americas under the name of Pettersson. He most likely died in the Americas.

References

1782 births
Prisoners and detainees of Sweden
19th-century criminals
People extradited from Sweden
Year of death missing
Finnish emigrants
Finnish people convicted of murder
Swedish-speaking Finns